Kudirithe Kappu Coffee  is a 2011 Telugu language film directed by Ramana Salva who has worked as a cinematographer for the movie Village Lo Vinayakudu. He makes his debut as a director with this film. The duo Mahi and Shiva who also produced Village Lo Vinayakudu, are jointly producing this movie under the banner of Shiva Productions and Moon Water Pictures. Varun Sandesh acts in the lead role along with the debutant actress Suma Bhattacharya in the opposite lead role. Yogeshwara Sharma, who is the son of acclaimed lyricist Sirivennala Seetha Rama Sastry, debuts himself as the music composer for this film. The producers of the movie have announced the start of the film and also remarked that the film would be an entertaining film as nice as a cup of hot coffee during the rains.

Plot
Kudirithe Kappu Coffee is a simple story. Venu (Varun Sandesh), son of Giridhar (Bhimaneni Srinivasa Rao) hates love after his dear friend Ravi commits suicide due to love failure. Lasya (Suma Bhattacharya) on the other hand is a student of hotel management who has a granny Malati (Sukumari), at Dakshinagiri hill station in AP border. Lasya's dream is to make her granny's coffee shoppe into a resort. Incidentally, Giridhar is a student of Malati. Giridhar has a coffee shoppe in Dakshinagiri in which Malati lives in.

Malati is under the impression that it belonged to her son. Once she realises it is not her property but Giridhar's, she decides to give it back to him. But she also has to repay the loan of Mohan (Tanikella Bharani) who operates Decent Lodge in Dakshinagiri. In such conditions, Giridhar sends Venu to take care of Malati and the coffee shoppe. Venu turns the coffee shoppe into a wedding venue and offers tourism packages to corporate but never reveals his identity. The rest of the story is about the conflict between Lasya and Venu, the property confusion, Mohan's plans and whether Venu and Lasya fall in love.

Cast 
 Varun Sandesh as Venu
 Suma Bhattacharya as Lasya
 Bhimaneni Srinivasa Rao as Giridhar
 Sukumari as Malati
 Tanikella Bharani as Mohan
 Sivannarayana Naripeddi
 Vamsi Krishna

Soundtrack 

Malayalam composer Rahul Raj was initially approached for composing the music, but he turned down the offer due to scheduling issues. Later Yogeshwara Sharma, son of veteran lyricist Sirivennela Sitaramasastri was roped in to compose the music. The music of Kudirithe Kappu Coffee was launched at a function arranged in Club Jayabheri on the night of 20 December 2010. This launch event was attended by M. M. Keeravani, Nimmagadda Prasad, Tammareddy Bharadwaja, Dil Raju, Varun Sandesh, Allari Naresh, Nani, Tanish, Sanjjanaa, Vamsi Krishna, R. P. Patnaik, Rajasimha, Abburi Ravi, Bhimaneni Srinivasa Rao, Daggubati Suresh Babu, C Kalyan, Sai Kumar Adivi, ES Maurthy etc. The lyrics of all the songs were penned by Sirivennela Sitaramasastri.

Reception
Mahesh S Koneru of 123telugu.com gave a review stating "Thanks to the greenery of Dakshinagiri, throughout the first half of the film, you feel like you are on a virtual holiday. Kudirithey Kappu Coffee might fall under the usual love story genre, but it manages to make a place for itself, as its feel good factors come from unexpected ways. Watch it for Varun Sandesh's best performance so far, for its rich visual treat and an easy love story." Jeevi of idlebrain.com gave a review stating "Kudirithe Kappu Coffee is a simple film with a predictable story line. The plus points are visuals, music and awesome locations. Lack of dramatic impact and hurried-up climax are the weak points. I wish the director would have executed the script with better emotional impact. On a whole, Kudirithe Kappu Coffee is a typical multiplex film with nice visuals/music." Y. Sunitha Chowdary of cinegoer.com gave a review stating "Kudirithe Kappu Coffee is a strictly okay movie.if you understand why Coffee figures in the story. For those who aren't coffee lovers you won't have much to do with this film, as you don't get what you've been promised..a story and a movement i.e., a katha and a kadhalika." Rediff.com gave a review stating "Verdant and picturesque locales, good cinematography, sonorous music and a pleasant love story written and directed well by Ramana Salwa makes Telugu film Kudirithe Kappu Coffee refreshing and pleasant. This love story is yet another addition to the umpteen ones seen on screen but its good treatment has made it a nice watch. Yet, one feels a sense of incompleteness and the lack of a cohesive narrative." supergoodmovies.com gave a review stating "Kudirithe Kappu Coffee will appeal to people who are patient enough to bear it and who has an open mind to analyze and summarize it. Rest of them could safely stay away from it." IndiaGlitz gave a review stating "This movie is a musical and visual splendour with a story that is now a heritage.At best, KKC merits for a one time watch." Sify.com gave a review stating "The movie might appeal to the A Class audiences, and might be liked by those who give priority to music and landscapes."

References

External links

2010s Telugu-language films
2011 films